A constitutional referendum was held in Albania on 7 November 1994.
Voters were asked whether they approved of the new constitution published on 6 October, which would have given more power to the country's president. However, it was rejected by voters, with just 43.6% in favour. Voter turnout was 84.4%.

Results

References

1994
1994 referendums
1994 in Albania
Constitutional referendums
November 1994 events in Europe